Leonid Fedorovych Kolumbet (14 October 1937 – 2 May 1983) was a Soviet track cyclist. Competing in the 4,000 m team pursuit he won a world title in 1963 and bronze medals at the 1960 Olympics and 1962 and 1964 world championships.

Kolumbet was Jewish. His brother Mykola Kolumbet was an Olympic road cyclist.

References

1937 births
1983 deaths
Soviet male cyclists
Cyclists at the 1960 Summer Olympics
Cyclists at the 1964 Summer Olympics
Ukrainian track cyclists
Olympic medalists in cycling
Olympic cyclists of the Soviet Union
Olympic bronze medalists for the Soviet Union
Jewish sportspeople
Soviet Jews
Ukrainian Jews
Medalists at the 1960 Summer Olympics